Roberto Elie (born 11 May 1959) is a Venezuelan former footballer. He competed in the men's tournament at the 1980 Summer Olympics.

References

External links

1959 births
Living people
Venezuelan footballers
Venezuela international footballers
Olympic footballers of Venezuela
Footballers at the 1980 Summer Olympics
Place of birth missing (living people)
Association football defenders
Deportivo Italia players
Caracas FC players
20th-century Venezuelan people
21st-century Venezuelan people